Ayala Malls Central Bloc is a large shopping mall in Cebu IT Park developed by Cebu Holdings Incorporated, becoming the second Ayala Mall in Cebu City, Philippines in 25 years since the opening of Ayala Center Cebu and its fifth regional mall in Visayas and Mindanao. It has a gross leasable area (GLA) of 45,000 square meters. The mall opened on December 6, 2019.

History
On March 20, 2015, Ayala Land broke ground at its Central Bloc project, a  project within Cebu IT Park. One of its components is the Ayala Malls Central Bloc which can cater up to 500 stores.

It has five levels of retail development, four digital cinemas, an indoor activity center, a fashion gallery, a food court, a basement supermarket, and a three-level basement parking. The mall was expected to open by October 2019 but was moved to December 6, 2019.

According to Ayala Malls VisMin head Clavel Tongco, the mall operates from 11:00 A.M. until 11:00 P.M. with people working in the business process outsourcing (BPO) industry as its main target market.

Incidents

Christmas tree fire
On December 26, 2019, just 20 days after its official opening, the mall's outdoor Christmas tree caught fire but was promptly extinguished by its emergency quick response team. It was likely to be caused by faulty wiring according to the Bureau of Fire Protection due to it being exposed in the rain.

See also
Ayala Center Cebu
SM City Cebu
SM City Consolacion
SM Seaside City Cebu
Robinsons Galleria Cebu

References

External links
 
 Ayala Malls Central Bloc
 
 

Shopping malls in Cebu City
Ayala Malls
Shopping malls established in 2019